Ahn Junghyo (This is the author's preferred Romanization per LTI Korea) is a South Korean novelist and literary translator.

Life

He was born December 2, 1941, in Seoul, where he graduated from Sogang University with a BA in English literature in 1965.  He worked as an English-language writer for the Korea Herald in 1964, and later served as a director for the Korea Times in 1975-1976.    He was Editorial Director for the Korean Division of Encyclopædia Britannica from 1971 to 1974.

He made his debut as a translator in 1975, when he published a Korean translation of One Hundred Years of Solitude by Gabriel Garcia Marquez which was serialized in the monthly .  From that time until the late 1980s, he translated approximately 150 foreign works into Korean.

Work

His first novel was Of War and the Metropolis, now known as White War (하얀전쟁), which was published in 1983 to a chilly critical reception. It discussed his experiences as a Republic of Korea Army soldier in the Vietnam War. He translated it into English and had it published in the United States, where it was released by SoHo Publishing in 1989 under the title The White Badge. In 1992 it was also made into a film, White Badge, shot on location in Vietnam. The book was then reissued in Korea as White War in 1993, and was received much more favorably than before.

Works in Korean 
White Badge (1983/1989)
Autumn Sea People (가을바다 사람들) (1993)
Silver Stallion (1990)
The Life of the Hollywood Kid (헐리우드키드의 생애) (1992)

Awards
  (1992)

See also 
Korean literature
Contemporary culture of South Korea

References

External links
 안정효(Ahn Junghyo) – 한국현대문학대사전

South Korean novelists
South Korean translators
1941 births
Living people
Sogang University alumni
South Korean expatriates in Vietnam
Korean military personnel of the Vietnam War
20th-century translators